Ger shuluun is a rural locality (a selo) in the central part of Khiloksky District in Zabaykalsky Krai, Russia, located on the right bank of the Khilok River,  east of the town of Khilok.  Population: 916 (2002).

History
It was founded in the end of the 19th century as a train stop and later became a train station. In 1905, a settlement grew around the station, the population of which was employed in the railway industry, as well as in wood processing and agriculture.

References
The Encyclopedia of Trans-Baikal.  Entry on "Gyrshelun" 

Rural localities in Zabaykalsky Krai